Thomas Mitchell Smith (born 14 December 1985) is a Welsh rugby union player. A flanker, he currently plays for Welsh regional team Ospreys having previously played for Neath RFC and the Ospreys academy.

Smith made his debut for the Ospreys as a replacement against Connacht in February 2007. In July 2012 he signed an extension contract with the Ospreys after there was speculation linking him with London Irish

International
Despite being born in England, Smith captained the Wales under-21 team.

References

External links
Ospreys profile

1985 births
Living people
Neath RFC players
Ospreys (rugby union) players
Rugby union flankers
Rugby union number eights
Rugby union players from Bristol
Welsh rugby union players